The 1916–17 Dartmouth men's ice hockey season was the 12th season of play for the program.

Season
After a disappointing finish the year before, Dartmouth got off to a great start with a win over perennial power, Princeton. With a loss to two-time defending champion Harvard in the next game, however, the Greens lost much hope of claiming the intercollegiate championship. That setback didn't deter them, however, as they won their next five intercollegiate matches, including Yale.

A huge shock for the season was when Yale defeated Harvard in their best-of-three series and caused the three Intercollegiate Hockey League teams to tie for the conference title. The tie left the door open for Dartmouth but the loss to Harvard prevented the Greens from being able to claim a superior record. So long as Harvard could trump Dartmouth the Hanoverians could not claim the championship despite a 6–1 intercollegiate record, the best in the nation.

Note: Dartmouth College did not possess a moniker for its athletic teams until the 1920s, however, the university had adopted 'Dartmouth Green' as its school color in 1866.

Roster

Standings

Schedule and Results

|-
!colspan=12 style=";" | Regular Season

References

Dartmouth Big Green men's ice hockey seasons
Dartmouth
Dartmouth
Dartmouth
Dartmouth